Cryptolechia semnodes is a moth in the family Depressariidae. It is endemic to New Zealand. It was first described by Edward Meyrick in 1911 using a specimen collected at Mount Arthur tableland in February. It is dark in appearance and likely belongs to another genus. This species flies in bright sunshine and is likely a very local species. It is likely that this species probably belongs to another genus and as such this species is also known as Cryptolechia (s.l.) semnodes.

Taxonomy 
This species was described by Edward Meyrick in 1911 using a specimen collected by George Hudson at Mount Arthur Tableland in February at an altitude of 4200 ft. Hudson discussed and illustrated this species in his 1928 book The butterflies and moths of New Zealand. It is likely that this species probably belongs to another genus and as such this species is also known as Cryptolechia (s.l.) semnodes. The holotype is held at the Natural History Museum, London.

 Description 
Meyrick described this species as follows:

In 1928 Alfred Philpott examined the male genitalia of specimens of this species and notes that this species differed significantly from other species in this genus. He noted that unlike other New Zealand endemic species in this genus C. semnodes'' had the gnathos present and the harpes were simple on the male genitalia.

Distribution

This species is endemic to New Zealand and has been collected at Mount Arthur tableland.

Behaviour
This species flies in the brightest sunshine and was regarded by Hudson as a very local insect.

References

Moths described in 1911
Cryptolechia (moth)
Moths of New Zealand
Endemic fauna of New Zealand
Taxa named by Edward Meyrick
Endemic moths of New Zealand